HMS Lochinvar was a repeat  which served with the Royal Navy during the First World War. Named after the character in the poem Marmion, the ship was originally to be called HMS Malice but was renamed prior to being launched on 9 October 1915. After the Armistice, the vessel was placed in reserve and sold to be broken up on 25 November 1921.

Design and development

Lochinvar was one of twenty two L- or s built for the Royal Navy. The design followed the preceding  but with improved seakeeping properties and armament, including twice the number of torpedo tubes. The destroyer was ordered but the British Admiralty under the Second War Programme as one of two repeat L class in November 1914.

Three funnels were fitted. The ship's complement was 73 officers and ratings.

Armament consisted of three QF  Mk IV guns on the ship's centreline, with one on the forecastle, one aft and one between the funnels. One single  Maxim gun was carried. A single 2-pounder  "pom-pom" anti-aircraft gun was later added. Torpedo armament consisted of two twin mounts for  torpedoes mounted aft. Capacity to lay four Vickers Elia Mk.4 mines was included, but the facility was never used. The vessel was equipped with a more advanced Barr and Stroud fire-control system than the majority of the class, modelled on that for the contemporary s.

Construction and career
Lochinvar was laid down by William Beardmore and Company at Dalmuir on the River Clyde on 9 January 1915 with the yard number 527. The vessel was intended to be a member of the M class and was laid down as Malice but to save time, the builders were instead ordered to follow the design of the L class and the ship was renamed accordingly on 15 February 1915. The vessel was named after the hero in poem Marmion. Constructed at the yard alongside sister ship , Lochinvar was launched on 9 October and completed on 1 December.

On commissioning, Lochinvar joined the Ninth Destroyer Flotilla as part of the Harwich Force. The tasks that the destroyer was called to engage in varied greatly. On 5 August, the destroyer was called upon to undertake an anti-submarine patrol and formed part of a flotilla sent to protect the Dover Barrage on 26 October. The vessel was moved to Plymouth, joining the Fourth Destroyer Flotilla in July.

After the Armistice of 11 November 1918 that ended the war, the Royal Navy returned to a peacetime level of strength and both the number of ships and the amount of personnel needed to be reduced to save money. Lochinvar was initially stationed in reserve at Devonport alongside 56 other destroyers. The destroyer was subsequently considered for sale to the Finnish Navy but the purchase was made impossible by the provisions of the Washington Naval Treaty which denied the sale of superfluous warships by the signatories. Instead, on 25 November 1921, Lochinvar was sold to Hayes of Porthcawl and broken up.

Pennant numbers

References

Citations

Bibliography

 
 
 
 
 
 
 
 
 
 
 
 
 
 
 * 

1915 ships
Laforey-class destroyers (1913)
Ships built on the River Clyde
World War I destroyers of the United Kingdom